The Slumgullion Earthflow in the San Juan Mountains in Hinsdale County, Colorado has been a National Natural Landmark since 1983. It is also a Colorado Natural Area and an Area of Critical Environmental Concern.

The earthflow lies a few miles south east of Lake City. It is "a striking example of mass wasting (the movement of large masses of earth material)." The Lake Fork of the Gunnison River was dammed by the earthflow, creating Lake San Cristobal. A second earthflow has been moving continuously for about 300 years over older stable rock. It moves at a rate of about 7 meters (23 feet) per year.

The area is a habitat for elk and deer. It is crossed by Colorado Highway 149, the principal highway of the area connecting Lake City, Colorado with Creede.

References 

Landforms of Hinsdale County, Colorado
San Juan Mountains (Colorado)
National Natural Landmarks in Colorado
Protected areas of Hinsdale County, Colorado
Geology of Colorado